Saint Mary's Glacier (or St. Marys) is a semi-permanent snowfield located in Arapaho National Forest in the U.S. state of Colorado. The nearest community is the unincorporated Alice, Colorado and is accessible via a 1.5 mile hike from a parking lot in Alice.

See also
List of glaciers in the United States

References

Glaciers of Colorado
Landforms of Clear Creek County, Colorado